Winterheart's Guild is the third studio album by the power metal band Sonata Arctica. It was released in 2003 through Spinefarm Records. In a 2014 interview, vocalist, keyboardist and songwriter Tony Kakko said inspiration for writing "The Ruins of My Life" came from the film Braveheart. In 2019, he would refer to the album's recording process as a "nightmare" because he only had "two or three" songs ready when the band went in the studio.

Reception

Loudwire named the album at eleventh in their list "Top 25 Power Metal Albums of All Time." Metal Hammer also included it in their 2016 list of 10 essential power metal albums.

Track listing

Personnel
 Tony Kakko – vocals, keyboards
 Jani Liimatainen – guitar
 Marko Paasikoski – bass guitar
 Tommy Portimo – drums
 Jens Johansson – keyboard solos on "The Cage", "Silver Tongue", "Victoria's Secret" and "Champagne Bath"

Technical personnel
Recorded by Ahti Kortelainen at Tico Tico Studios in September–November 2002
Mixed by Mikko Karmila at Finnvox Studios and mastered by Mika Jussila at Finnvox Studios in November–December 2002.
Produced by Sonata Arctica

Charts

Certifications

References

External links
 Album info
 Lyrics at Rawrix.net

Sonata Arctica albums
2003 albums
Spinefarm Records albums